The National Rural Electric Cooperative Association (NRECA) represents the interests of over 900 electric cooperatives in the United States. Cooperatives are not-for-profit and are owned by their membership. Founded in 1942, NRECA unites the country's generation, transmission, and distribution cooperatives found in 47 states, serving over 40 million people. It is headquartered in Arlington, Virginia, and its CEO is Jim Matheson.

Electric cooperatives serve 12 percent of the nation's population, yet own 42 percent of America's distribution lines covering three-quarters of the country. Currently, over 90% of electric cooperatives include renewable generation in their portfolios, receiving 11 percent of their total power from renewable sources compared to 8 percent for the entire utility sector.

In December 2020, co-ops under NRECA won $1.6 billion from the FCC's Rural Digital Opportunity Fund to provide rural broadband service to approximately 900,000 locations. In February 2021, NRECA's Matheson filed an appeal to the FCC for also awarding SpaceX's Starlink internet service funds. SpaceX was awarded $886 million to cover nearly 650,000 locations. Matheson noted the Starlink service was "still in beta testing - not a proven technology".

See also
 Touchstone Energy Cooperatives
 Willie Wiredhand

References

External links
 

Organizations based in Arlington County, Virginia
1942 establishments in the United States
 
Trade associations based in the United States
Cooperative federations